Sharrah is a surname. Notable people with this surname include:

 Corben Sharrah (born 1992), American BMX rider
 Saleh Al-Sharrah (born 1973), Kuwaiti judoka

See also
 Sharia